Der Komunist ('The Communist') was a Yiddish language newspaper published from Kharkov, Ukraine 1920–1922. In the midst of the Russian Civil War, Der Komunist was printed on blue wrapping paper (normally used for packing sugar). By March 1921, it was estimated to have had a circulation of 2,000 copies.

References

Jews and Judaism in Kharkiv
Mass media in Kharkiv
Defunct newspapers published in Ukraine
Newspapers established in 1920
Publications disestablished in 1922
Secular Jewish culture in Ukraine
Socialism in Ukraine
Yiddish communist newspapers
Yiddish culture in Ukraine